is a passenger railway station located in Nishi-ku, Yokohama, Japan, operated by the private railway operator Sagami Railway (Sotetsu).

Lines 
Nishi-Yokohama Station is served by the Sagami Railway Main Line, and lies 1.8 kilometers from the starting point of the line at Yokohama Station.

Station layout
The station consists of a single island platform serving two tracks.

Platforms

History 
Nishi-Yokohama Station was opened on February 14, 1929 and was the terminal of the Jinchū Railway until the opening of Hiranumabashi Station in 1931. The station was primarily a freight terminal connecting the Sotetsu Line with the national railway's freight terminal at Hodogaya Station via a short branch line. The freight service on the branch was discontinued on September 30, 1979. On February 14, 1993 an unexploded bomb from World War II was discovered during construction work near the station. The current station building dates from June 26, 2005.

Passenger statistics
In fiscal 2019, the station was used by an average of 14,831 passengers daily.

The passenger figures for previous years are as shown below.

Surrounding area
 Fujidana Shopping Street
Nico Nico Shopping Street
Nishimae Shopping Street
Japan National Route 1

See also
 List of railway stations in Japan

References

External links 

 Official home page  

Railway stations in Kanagawa Prefecture
Railway stations in Japan opened in 1929
Railway stations in Yokohama